Sexual encounters in private between two adults are legal. Although homosexuality was decriminalized, LGBT Dominicans still endure discrimination and violence due to their sexual orientation and/or gender identity. In a 2014 poll, almost three quarters, 73%, of people in the Dominican Republic alone have said that members of the LGBT community have experienced some sort of violence or discrimination. Members of the LGBT Community in the Dominican Republic are victims of hate crimes, extortion by the police, and discrimination when it comes to resources and employment services. They also face discrimination when seeking treatment from health care systems. Between 2006 and August 2015, there have been 32 reports of possible hate crimes against transgender people.:5

Trans people

Due to employment discrimination against LGBT members, a lot of transgender women resort to sex work. A local NGO counted 17 cases of police violence and discrimination against transgender women sex workers between December 2013 and October 2014.:6

Homosexuals 

Homosexuality in the Dominican Republic was decriminalized in 1822.  
 Since June 17, 1944, same-sex marriage has been unrecognized by the country. Their constitution states that marriage is a union between a man and a woman. In 2010, once the new constitution was written again, it included that same-sex marriage was prohibited.
 On July 1, 2001, the first Gay Pride parade was held in Santo Domingo.
 As of January 24, 2007, Homosexuality is legal within the Dominican Republic. However, there are no laws that protect LGBT members from discrimination in housing and places of employment.
  Law 285-66 prohibits LGBT people from serving as members of the police force. Under this law, police officers are also prohibited from engaging in sodomy.  In 2014, the law was confirmed that LGBT members were prohibited from joining any police force.
 Homosexuality is seen as a disease. Exercises such as electroshocks. Conversion therapy is legal in the Dominican Republic.

See also
 Discrimination against transgender people

References

Dominican Republic
History of the Dominican Republic
LGBT in the Dominican Republic